Undertow is a 2009 internationally co-produced romantic drama film directed by Javier Fuentes-León and marks his directorial long-feature debut. Initial financing came from Germany and France with additional financing  from Peru. The film shot in Cabo Blanco, Peru, won the World Cinema Audience Award in the Dramatic category at the 2010 Sundance Film Festival in the U.S.A. Other Audience Awards included Cartagena, Montreal, Miami, Chicago, Utrecht, Lima, and Galway, as well as Jury Awards in Madrid, San Francisco, Seattle, Toulouse, and Philadelphia. It received a nomination as Best Latin American Film at the 2011 Goya Awards in Spain.

The film was also selected as the Peruvian entry for the Best Foreign Language Film at the 83rd Academy Awards but it did not make the final shortlist.

Plot
Miguel (Cristian Mercado) is a young fisherman of Cabo Blanco, a small village in northern Peru with specific traditions regarding death. He is married to Mariela (Tatiana Astengo), who is pregnant with their first son, but he also has a secret affair with a male painter called Santiago (Manolo Cardona) who he meets for trysts at a deserted cave on the coast.

Santiago accidentally drowns at sea, and his ghost returns to ask Miguel to find his body, in order to bury it with their village's rituals. Miguel eventually finds Santiago's body in the water, but does not tell his ghost of the discovery. Meanwhile, the villagers discover nude paintings of Miguel at Santiago's house, fueling a rumour that they were having an affair. Mariela hears the rumours, confronts Miguel about them, and upon hearing him confess, she goes to her mother's house with their newborn child.

Miguel returns to look for the body of Santiago, but he finds that the current has taken it away. Mariela eventually returns home, but then the body of Santiago appears in the nets of a fishing boat. Miguel decides to claim the body of Santiago for a burial at sea as his lover wanted. He takes the shrouded body of Santiago to sea, but a second after the body is committed to the waves, the ghost of Santiago reappears for a last time, caressing Miguel, who returns home alone in the sundown.

Cast
 Cristian Mercado as Miguel
 Manolo Cardona as Santiago
 Tatiana Astengo as Mariela

Production
Undertow had been gestating since 1996, when the director Javier Fuentes-León wrote the very first scene. Originally conceived as a supernatural revenge thriller about a fisherman having an affair with a prostitute, Javier decided to change it after coming out of the closet himself, in an attempt to explore more interesting themes and material.

Critical reception
The film received positive reviews from critics. Review aggregator Rotten Tomatoes reports that 88% out of 32 critics gave the film a positive review, with a rating average of 7.3/10. Manohla Dargis from The New York Times praised the director's ability to show powerful relationships between the characters, particularly focusing on the complexity of Miguel's feelings for Mariela, which she called "gratifying". David Wiegang from the San Francisco Chronicle also gave the film a positive review, saying that the "film's accomplishments are many, but not the least is its ability to take a human story and frame it as a parable, without losing a bit of credibility or irresistible heart."

Pam Grady from Boxoffice Magazine wrote “Sensual and romantic with a heavy dose of the supernatural and populated by indelible characters.” Bob Mondello from NPR wrote “Undertow, for all its narrative tricks, has been given the rhythm and texture of real life, as well as emotional undercurrents that are haunting.”

Awards and nominations
For Undertow
2009: Won Sebastian Award at the San Sebastián International Film Festival
2010: Won Audience Awards for "World Cinema – Dramatic" category at the Sundance Film Festival
2010: Nominated for Grand Jury Prize for "World Cinema – Dramatic" category at the Sundance Film Festival
2010: Won Audience Award for Ibero-American competition at Miami Film Festival
2010: Nominated for Golden India Catalina for "Best Film (Mejor Película)" at Cartagena Film Festival
2011: Nominated GLAAD Media Award for Outstanding Film – Limited Release
2011: Nominated for Goya for "Best Spanish Language Foreign Film" at Goya Awards

See also
 List of submissions to the 83rd Academy Awards for Best Foreign Language Film
 List of Peruvian submissions for the Academy Award for Best Foreign Language Film
 List of lesbian, gay, bisexual, or transgender-related films by storyline

References

External links
Undertow / Contracorriente Official website

2009 films
2000s coming-of-age drama films
2009 directorial debut films
2009 romantic drama films
Films directed by Javier Fuentes-León
2009 LGBT-related films
2000s Peruvian films
2000s Spanish-language films
Peruvian romantic drama films
Peruvian LGBT-related films
LGBT-related romantic drama films
LGBT-related coming-of-age films
Male bisexuality in film
Magic realism films
Shoreline Entertainment films
Colombian drama films
Gay-related films